This is a list of plantations and pens in Jamaica by county and parish including historic parishes that have since been merged with modern ones. Plantations produced crops, such as sugar cane and coffee, while livestock pens produced animals for labour on plantations and for consumption. Both industries used the forced labour of enslaved peoples.

James Robertson's map of Jamaica, published in 1804 based on a survey of 1796–99, identified 814 sugar plantations and around 2,500 pens or non-sugar plantations.

Cornwall County

Hanover

 Axe and Adze
 Bachelor's Hall
 Betsy Mount
 Caldwell
 Chester Castle
 Comfort Hall
 Cousins Cove
 Cottage
 Haughton Court
 Haughton Grove
 Haughton Hall
 Haughton Tower
 Hopewell (Bucknor's)
 Prospect
 Knockalva
 Retirement 
 Rock Springs 
 Salt Spring
 Saxham
 Tryall

Saint Elizabeth
 Appleton
 Chocolate Hole
 Mount Charles

Saint James

 Cinnamon Hill
 Kensington Estate
 Old Montpelier

 Roehampton

 Rose Hall
 Running Gut
 Spring Vale Pen

Trelawny

 Bryan Castle
 Green Park Estate, Jamaica (known as Green Pond prior to 1764)
 Good Hope
 Long Pond Estate 
 Windsor Estate

Westmoreland
 Blackheath
 Friendship and Greenwich
 George's Plain
 Mesopotamia
 Midgeham

Middlesex County

Clarendon
 Pindar's Valley
Endeavor

 Whitney

Manchester
Spring Grove

Metcalfe (Now in Saint Mary)
Come See- Coffee Plantation.

Saint Ann
 Antrim
 Cardiff Hall
 Colliston
 Egypt 
 Grier Park
 Minard

Saint Catherine

 Spring Garden

Saint John
(now in Saint Catherine)
 Guanaboa Vale

Saint Mary
 Albion
 Bayly's Vale
 Brimmer Hall
 Frontier
 Nonsuch

 Trinity
 Tryall
 Unity
 Whitehall

Saint Thomas in the Vale
(now in Saint Catherine)

 Grays

Vere
(now in Clarendon)

Surrey County

Kingston Parish

Portland

 Golden Vale

Port Royal
(now divided between Kingston and Saint Andrew)
 Mavis Bank

Saint Andrew
 Constant Spring
Hampstead Park
 Hope Estate
 Middleton

Saint David
(Now in Saint Thomas)
 Abbey Green
 Aeolus Valley Estate
 Albion
 Arntully
 Spring Garden
 Swamps

Saint George
(now divided between Saint Mary and Portland)
 Rodney Hall

 Spring Garden

Saint Thomas (Saint Thomas in the East)

 Holland
 Rhine

 Richmond Vale
 Williamsfield
 Wilson's Gap

See also
List of plantation great houses in Jamaica

References

External links 
 

Agriculture in Jamaica
Slavery in Jamaica